

People
Yellin is the surname of:

Aryeh Leib Yellin (1820–1886), Polish rabbi
Bob Yellin (born 1936), American bluegrass musician 
David Yellin (1864–1941), Jewish leader and educator in Palestine
Dustin Yellin (born 1975), American artist 
Jean Fagan Yellin, American historian
Jerry Yellin (1924–2017), United States Air Force officer
Jessica Yellin (born 1971), American TV journalist
Linda Yellin, American memoirist, novelist, and humorist
Nathan Yellin-Mor (1913–1980), Russian-born revisionist Zionist activist, Lehi leader and Israeli politician
Pete Yellin (1941–2016), American jazz musician
Robert Yellin, American Japanese ceramics specialist 
Roei Yellin (born 1981), Israeli sprint canoer
Samuel Yellin (1885–1940), American master blacksmith
Tamar Yellin, English teacher and author
Yitzhak Yaakov Yellin (1885–1964), Israeli Hebrew language and press pioneer

Fictional
Yellin, a character in William Goldman's The Princess Bride

See also
 Jelen
 Yellen

de:Yellin